Carson v. Makin, 596 U.S. ___ (2022), was a United States Supreme Court case related to the First Amendment to the United States Constitution and the Free Exercise Clause. It was a follow-up to Espinoza v. Montana Department of Revenue.

The case centered on the limits of school vouchers offered by the state of Maine, which had disallowed the vouchers to be used to pay for religious-based private schools. In a 6–3 decision the Court ruled that Maine's restrictions on vouchers violated the Free Exercise Clause, as they discriminated against religious-backed private schools. The minority opinions argued that the decision worked against the long-standing principle of the  separation of church and state, since state governments would now be required to fund religious institutions.

Background 
In many states in the United States, the state may offer tuition assistance for private schools in lieu of public schools for primary education, using school vouchers. However, several states have established in their constitution, through way of a Blaine Amendment or similar wording, that the state cannot fund religious schools. In the case of Maine, about half of the students live in rural areas, and many of these towns lack public high schools. Since 1873, the state provided tuition assistance program for residents of those localities to send their children to nearby public or private schools, which until 1980 included religious schools. The program funds around 11 nonsectarian private schools exist across the state, handling approximately 4,800 students, and additional nonsectarian schools in neighboring states. The state changed the program in 1980 to disallow the vouchers to be used for secular schools run by religious organizations on the basis that funding these schools violated the U.S. and state Constitution on the Establishment Clause and separation of church and state.

During the Trump administration, the issue of school choice had become a major issue under President Donald Trump and his Secretary of Education Betsy DeVos. Trump pushed on Congress to pass legislation to support school choice and vouchers, including for religious schools, but failed to gain sufficient support due to conflicts in the Senate and the unlikely chance of its success in the Democrat-controlled House of Representatives.

Earlier, Zelman v. Simmons-Harris had established that an Ohio voucher program which allowed parents to use the vouchers for private religious schools did not violate the Establishment Clause. Leading into Carson the Supreme Case ruled in two precedent cases. The first was Trinity Lutheran Church of Columbia, Inc. v. Comer, in which the Court ruled that denying a religious school in Missouri the funds to rebuild a playground while providing funds to non-secular schools violated the Free Exercise Clause of the First Amendment, and that government programs cannot discriminate on the basis of religion in their operations. The second was Espinoza v. Montana Department of Revenue that if states do offer such assistance, they cannot prevent such tuition from being used for religious schools simply because the school was religious.

Lower courts
With the Trinity Lutheran decision in 2017, the Institute for Justice took representation of two Maine families to challenge the exclusion of sectarian schools from the program in 2018. The filing argued a test was developed in Trinity Lutheran, that "The government must remain neutral with regard to religion — neither favoring nor disfavoring it — and the participants must exercise a genuine choice between religious and nonreligious options." As the voucher program discriminated against religious schools, the program was not neutral and therefore unconstitutional. The Institute also backed a second case in Washington state over its work-study program that prevented participants from being employed by religious organizations, though this case was ultimately dismissed.

The families' case was first heard in the United States District Court for the District of Maine, which found for the state in 2019. The case was appealed to the First Circuit. While the case was in preparation for hearing, the Supreme Court issued its ruling in Espinoza, and the families filed a new brief asking the First Circuit to weigh this new decision in their deliberations. The majority opinion of the First Circuit upheld the district court's ruling, stating that as Maine's program based its voucher allowance on whether schools taught and proselytized religion with the voucher funds, rather than the school simply run by a religious organization, the program fell within the separation of church and state.

Supreme Court
Certiorari was granted in the case on July 2, 2021. Oral arguments were held on December 8, 2021. The state argued that its program does provide school vouchers for private schools with "substantially the same education provided in the public schools", and do not choose to fund those that have a significant religious teaching component. The state also contended that the program was not a school choice program, but intended to aid students where there is otherwise no local high school in reasonably close distance for them to attend. The families' council argued that as soon as Maine's program allows for parents to decide on an alternative to a public school for their children, "it has to remain neutral as between religious and non-religious private schools". The Cato Institute, Hillsdale College, The Church of Jesus Christ of Latter-day Saints, and the Americans for Prosperity Foundation filed amicus briefs in support for the petitioner, and The Freedom From Religion Foundation, The American Civil Liberties Union, and the National School Boards Association filed amicus briefs in support for the respondent.

Ruling 
In a 6-3 decision the Supreme Court ruled on ideological lines that Maine's nonsectarian requirement for tuition assistance violates the Free Exercise Clause of the First Amendment to the United States Constitution, struck down the Maine law, and reversed the lower court opinion. Chief Justice John Roberts wrote the opinion of the Court for himself and five other Justices. Justice Stephen Breyer wrote a dissenting opinion joined fully by Justice Elena Kagan and joined partially by Justice Sonia Sotomayor. Justice Sotomayor wrote a separate dissenting opinion.

Opinion of the Court 
In his majority opinion Chief Justice John Roberts wrote that the State violated the Free Exercise Clause of the United States Constitution as it prevents religious observers from receiving public benefits. He cited various cases where the court struck down actions that did so, such as Espinoza and Trinity Lutheran. He stated that the Maine legislature excluded "private religious schools from those eligible to receive such funds" and such a decision by the state reaches a greater separation of church and state than intended in the Establishment Clause of the United States Constitution. He wrote on the basis of Zelman, "a benefit program under which private citizens 'direct government aid to religious schools wholly as a result of their own genuine and independent private choice' does not offend the Establishment Clause." The court ruled that Maine purposefully "identify and exclude otherwise eligible schools on the basis of their religious exercise" and that such is a "discrimination against religion".

Dissents 
Justice Stephen Breyer wrote a dissenting opinion joined fully by Justice Elena Kagan and joined partially by Justice Sonia Sotomayor. Justice Sotomayor wrote a separate dissenting opinion. Breyer expressed concern that Carson v. Makin could require states to fund religious schools with taxpayer money, writing that the ruling paid "almost no attention" to the First Amendment's prohibitions on the state's establishment of religion while "giving almost exclusive attention" the Amendment's prohibitions on religious free exercise. Breyer also wrote that the ruling broke with historical precedent, that Supreme Court had "never previously held what the Court holds today, namely, that a State must (not may) use state funds to pay for religious education as part of a tuition program designed to ensure the provision of free statewide public school education."

In her dissent, Sotomayor wrote that in 5 years, the Court has "shift[ed] from a rule that permits States to decline to fund religious organizations to one that requires States in many circumstances to subsidize religious indoctrination with taxpayer dollars." She argued that the decision in Carson "continues to dismantle the wall of separation between church and state that the framers fought to build."

Analysis 
While only one other state, Vermont, had a similar voucher program as Maine's, analysts anticipated that the decision would spur religious groups to seek similar programs in conservative states. Supporters of the ruling, including several religious groups, stated that the ruling would enhance religious liberties and "school-choice."

Many critics believe that the ruling in this case is a "further erosion" of the separation of church and state.

Steve Vladeck from CNN wrote that this ruling would be "putting (state) government(s) in the awkward position of having to choose between directly funding religious activity or not providing funding at all".

References

External links 
 

2022 in United States case law
United States Supreme Court cases
United States Supreme Court cases of the Roberts Court
United States free exercise of religion case law